Organic Maps is a free and open-source offline mobile map and navigation app for Android & iOS. It is based on top of crowd-sourced OpenStreetMap data. The app is privacy-focused and has 0 trackers in it. It is a fork of Maps.me application, which became proprietary software after being sold to Daegu Limited. The app is similar to OsmAnd, offering walking, hiking, and cycling paths, turn-by-turn navigation, dark mode, and most basic features.

Features 
Free
No ads, no tracking
Detailed offline maps of the World
Cycling routes, hiking trails, and walking paths
Contour lines, elevation profiles, peaks, and slopes
Turn-by-turn walking, cycling, and car navigation with voice guidance
Fast offline search on the map and bookmarks
Bookmarks export and import in KML/KMZ formats
Dark Mode

Developer 
Organic Maps is developed by some of the original creators of MAPS.ME (MapsWithMe), and is legally registered in Estonia.

See also 

List of free and open-source software packages
Comparison of satellite navigation software
OpenStreetMap

References

External links 
 
 

Free and open-source Android software
OpenStreetMap
Mobile route-planning software
Satellite navigation software